Jean Pierre Félicien Mallefille (May 3, 1813 – November 24, 1868) was a French novelist and playwright.

Mallefille was born in Mauritius. He wrote a number of plays, including Glenarvon (1835), Les sept enfants de Lara (1836), Le cœur et la dot (1852), and Les sceptiques (1867), as well as two comedies, and two novels, Le collier (1845) and La confession du Gaucho (1868). A farce of his, Les deux veuves, later formed the basis of the libretto for Bedřich Smetana's opera The Two Widows.

He also wrote a scenario in French that was to have been the basis of a libretto for the opera Sardanapalo by Franz Liszt, but delivered it so late that Liszt, angered at his unreliability, had commissioned an Italian libretto from another writer; in the end the opera was never completed.

Mallefille also had a relationship with George Sand.

References

1813 births
1868 deaths
British Mauritius people
19th-century French dramatists and playwrights
19th-century French novelists
French male novelists
19th-century French male writers
Mauritian novelists